Milton Court, at the far west of the town of Dorking, is a 17th-century country house in Surrey.  The court was expanded and substantially rebuilt by the Victorian architect William Burges and is a Grade II* listed building including the attached forecourt walls, balustrading, terrace, piers, urns and stone-carved ball finial.

Originally a priory, the estate was granted to George Evelyn, father of the diarist John Evelyn at the Protestant Reformation. George Evelyn was lord of the adjoining manor of Wotton, Surrey where the family had established themselves at Wotton House. In the nineteenth century, the court was bought by Lachlan Mackintosh Rate, a wealthy lawyer, banker and philanthropist. He employed William Burges to undertake substantial rebuilding.  Working in an ornate Jacobean style, Burges added twenty rooms, with elaborate fireplaces and ceilings.  Perhaps the most successful is the famed Flower room, formerly Mrs Rate's boudoir.  Nikolaus Pevsner describes it as "a picturesque seven-bay house with shaped gables".

The house is now the UK headquarters of the health insurance company Unum, which has worked to restore the house and its interior decoration.

Notes

References

Further reading
 Cattermole, Paul, A History of Milton Court & Part of the Manor of Milton (2011) Unum Limited
 Mordaunt-Crook, J William Burges and the High Victorian Dream (1981) John Murray
 The Victorian Web, William Burges: An Overview (2007)

Country houses in Surrey
Grade II* listed buildings in Surrey
William Burges buildings
Grade II* listed houses